The Lincoln Y-block V8 engine was Ford's earliest OHV V8 engine, introduced by Lincoln in the 1952 model year. Like the later and better-known but even more short-lived Ford Y-block engine, its block's deep skirts gave the block the appearance of the letter Y from the front.

The Y-block's development was in response to the sales success of the competing Oldsmobile "Rocket" and Cadillac OHV V8 engines, introduced in the 1949 model year, the Buick "Nailhead" engine introduced in the 1953 model year, and the OHV V8 Chrysler Hemi engine in 1951. Also, Ford needed larger and more powerful truck engines. The basic engine design was produced through 1963. It was replaced by the newer MEL engine for car applications in 1958, and was replaced in heavy-duty truck applications by the FT (330/361/391) engines starting in 1964.

279
A  version of the Lincoln Y-block was produced for heavy-duty truck applications for the 1952 through 1955 model years.

302
The  version of the Lincoln Y-block was used for heavy-duty truck applications from the 1956 through the 1963 model year. The engine was optional equipment on the Ford T-700 Series and standard equipment on the Ford F-750, C-750, and B-750 Series heavy-duty trucks.

317
The engine was unchanged in 1954 except for the vacuum advance mechanism. These engines used hydraulic valve lifters while Ford truck engines used solid. The stock Lincoln 317 powered the "Mexican Road Race Lincolns". The 317 was replaced by the 341 for automobile applications in the 1955 model year. Like the 279, the 317 was also used in heavy-duty truck applications for the 1952-55 model years .

Lincolns powered by the 317 won the top four spots in the Stock Car category of the Pan American Road Race in both 1952 and 1953. In 1954 Lincolns took first and second place.

332
The  version of the Lincoln Y-block was used for heavy-duty truck applications from the 1956 through the 1963 model year. The engine was standard equipment on the Ford F-800, F-900, T-750, T-800, C-800, and C-900 Series heavy-duty trucks.

341

368
The 368 was standard equipment on all Lincolns in the 1956 and 1957 model years, and standard on the Mercury Turnpike Cruiser and Colony Park and optional on the Mercury Montclair, Monterey, Voyager, and Commuter in 1957, its final year.

Lincoln Y-block engine family

Bore spacing 
Although classified by some as a medium-block V8 (due to its relatively modest maximum displacement of ), the Lincoln Y-block is a big-block engine in size.

A useful comparison is the Oldsmobile V8 engine, which came in both small-block and big-block versions from 1965 to 1976. By this measure the Lincoln Y-block has a larger engine block than the Oldsmobile "big-block."

See also
List of Ford engines

References

External links
Short descriptions of Ford overhead valve V8 engines

V8
V8 engines
Gasoline engines by model